Gayle or Gayl may refer to:

People
 Gayle (given name), people with the given name
 Gayle (surname), people with the surname
 Gayle (singer) (born 2004), American singer-songwriter

Places
 Gayle, North Yorkshire, England
 Gayle, Jamaica, a village
 Gayle Mill, South Carolina, United States

Other uses
 Gayle language, a South African argot
 Gayle, a system controller chip in the Amiga 600 and 1200 computers

See also
 
 Gayl (disambiguation)
 Gayles (disambiguation)
 Gael (disambiguation)
 Gail (disambiguation)
 Gale (disambiguation)